Maria K. Farmer (born 1969) is an American visual artist known for providing the first criminal complaint to law enforcement, to the New York City Police Department and to the FBI, in 1996 about the conduct of financier and convicted sex offender Jeffrey Epstein. Farmer, a figurative painter, had described her and her sister Annie's experiences of sexual misconduct from Epstein and Ghislaine Maxwell to a journalist at Vanity Fair in 2002 but the publication refrained from including it in their accounts.

Early life and education
Farmer was born in 1969 or 1970 in Paducah, Kentucky to Frank Farmer and Janice Swain. She has two younger brothers and two younger sisters. The family lived for a time in Phoenix, Arizona.  From an early age, she had a set intention to become an artist.

Farmer attended Santa Clara University and graduated in 1992.  She relocated to New York City in 1993 to study at the New York Academy of Art. She earned her master's degree from the Academy in 1995.  Farmer attended a post-graduate workshop at the Santa Fe Art Institute in 1995.

Career
Farmer is a visual artist who primarily makes paintings and pastel drawings of individual people or groups of people. In the mid 1990s, while Farmer was in graduate school, she reported selling her artwork for $20,000 directly from her studio. At her graduate exhibition in 1995, the school's dean, Eileen Guggenheim, introduced Farmer to both Jeffrey Epstein, who served as a board member at the Academy from 1987 to 1994, and to his companion Ghislaine Maxwell. Although Farmer had already sold her painting for $12,000 to a German buyer, Epstein reportedly wanted to buy it at the reception for half price and Guggenheim urged Farmer to cut him a deal. Prior to the introduction, Farmer was aware that Epstein regularly attended the Academy's events and frequently observed art students working in their studios. The pair were known at the school to be important art patrons.

In the summer of 1995, Farmer was one of four artists chosen to attend an all-expenses-paid trip to Santa Fe. Several of the artists confirmed that they attended a dinner party, hosted by Epstein and Maxwell with Guggenheim, that was designed to test the artists boundaries within a bizarre and competitive environment where the women were promised that one of them would be rewarded with a major commissioned artwork for Epstein's New Mexico property. However, no commission materialized.

Back in New York, Farmer was recruited to work for Epstein, first as his art advisor, where she oversaw the acquisition of artwork by Chuck Bowdish and Damian Loeb for Epstein's collection. She continued to work for Epstein at the front desk of his New York mansion, signing in "tradesmen, decorators, and friends". She observed a large number of young girls coming and going from the house, and stated that Maxwell would leave on frequent missions to recruit girls for Epstein. She described Epstein showing her the security room at his New York mansion that was equipped with extensive video surveillance devices focused on the beds and toilets in the property. Farmer reportedly saw lawyer Alan Dershowitz regularly visiting Epstein's New York home.

Wexner artist residency
In the summer of 1996, Farmer was commissioned to create two artworks for the film set of As Good as It Gets. At the time, Farmer was living in a small walk-up apartment in Greenwich Village. Epstein offered her more space to create the artwork as an artist-in-residence at a (10,600 sq. ft.) guest home on Les Wexner's property in New Albany, Ohio. In May 1996, Farmer traveled to the Wexner property in Ohio in a rental truck with her art materials and supplies. The property was spacious but Farmer was disturbed to learn after arrival that the home was guarded by Wexner's armed security personnel and she was required to phone Wexner's wife, Abigail Wexner, for permission to leave the home or property.

Farmer stated, in an affidavit filed in support of a defamation lawsuit brought by Virginia Giuffre against Alan Dershowitz, that Epstein and Maxwell came to the property in Ohio and sexually assaulted her. She managed to escape into another part of the house and barricaded herself inside by pushing furniture up against the door. She contacted  members of her family, her mentor artist Eric Fischl, and reached out to authorities. Security guards on the property told her that she could not leave and she was held against her will for 12 hours. Farmer was eventually able to depart the scene when her father arrived, after driving from Kentucky to Ohio, to pick her up.

Later that summer, Farmer learned that her younger sister Annie had also been assaulted by Epstein when Annie had visited him at his Zorro Ranch in New Mexico in April 1996. In a lawsuit filed in 2019 against Epstein's estate, Annie Farmer stated that Epstein had groped, harassed, and crawled into bed with her in New Mexico, whereas Maxwell had given her an inappropriate topless massage.

Farmer called the New York City Police Department and the FBI on August 26, 1996 and reported the assault. The authorities did not take action regarding the assault. The NYPD did make a report about the property theft of Farmer's artwork by Maxwell and Epstein.

In 2002, Farmer, her sister, and her mother also shared their stories with journalist Vicky Ward, then at Vanity Fair, who was writing a profile on Epstein. Despite the Farmer sisters and their mother giving voice to the misconduct, their mention was excluded from the final story by then-editor Graydon Carter. Carter later alleged that he had been pressured by Epstein at the time of publication to omit mention of the Farmer sisters; Carter's residence and the Vanity Fair office had each received ominous signals (a bullet and a cat's head) at times corresponding to when they might have further investigated Epstein.

The art collector Stuart Pivar confirmed that he learned of Farmer's experience shortly after it occurred. Artist Eric Fischl also corroborated Farmer's account and confirmed being contacted by her. Maxwell threatened Farmer's life repeatedly after the event in an effort to enforce her silence. Following the Vanity Fair profile on Epstein in which editors decided not to publish Farmer's account, she has stated that the threats intensified, leading her to leave the New York art world.

Farmer has stated that she received multiple direct threats from Maxwell and Epstein, who also called her clients and contacts in the art world in an effort to destroy her credibility. She stated: “I was terrified of Maxwell and Epstein and I moved a number of times to try to hide from them.” After enduring persistent threats, Farmer changed her name and moved first to North Carolina. For 24 years, she quietly sold antiques and restored houses in the American Southeast, in an effort to stay under the radar.

The FBI reappeared in 2006 at Farmer's door to question her just before Epstein's arrest for his first criminal prosecution, but little came of the matter. Farmer was contacted once more in 2016, this time by lawyers who were working with Virginia Giuffre. Still in hiding, Farmer recounted her experiences with Epstein and Maxwell to Stanley Pottinger and Bradley Edwards to assist in a better understanding of the defendants' patterns over time.

Decision to speak out publicly 
After being diagnosed with a brain tumor by early 2019, Farmer described her realization and anger over the impact that the abuse (plus the years of hiding after threats to her life) had on her and her family as the impetus for speaking out publicly. On April 16, 2019, Farmer filed a sworn affidavit in federal court in New York, alleging that she and her 15-year-old sister, Annie, had been sexually assaulted by Epstein and Maxwell in separate locations in 1996.

In an interview with Grazia in September 2019, Farmer expressed that it was the betrayal by women that she found hardest to bear in addition to the disinterest with which the authorities handled her early reports of abusive behavior by Epstein and Maxwell. In November 2019, Farmer was also interviewed by Anthony Mason for CBS This Morning.

ABC News reported that Farmer and her younger sister Annie shared similarities with Chauntae Davies and her younger sister Teala in that Epstein manipulated the trust within both family groups to further his criminal interest in abusing young girls.

In late 2019 and early 2020, five wrestlers, survivors of the Ohio State University abuse scandal, publicly called on state and federal officials to conduct further inquiry into Farmer's allegations of sexual assault at the Wexner property. The wrestlers called for greater accountability regarding the Wexner family's involvement in Epstein's abuse and raised their concerns about the continuing influence of Abigail and Leslie Wexner serving as the "biggest and best-known benefactors" of the university.

Farmer appeared in a four-part Netflix series, released in May 2020, Jeffrey Epstein: Filthy Rich, directed by Lisa Bryant and based on the earlier book of the same name by James Patterson.

Recent artwork
In January 2020, Farmer was reportedly working on a series of paintings and pastel drawings called “The Survivors Project” consisting of individual portraits of known survivors of Epstein's abuse. She claims the harm experienced by countless other victims of Epstein could have been prevented had authorities acted when she first reported the abuse.

Farmer created a seven foot long artwork on canvas about the Epstein abuse network which depicted individuals involved in the scandal in a style akin to Hieronymus Bosch.

Personal life
After being diagnosed with a brain tumor and non-Hodgkin lymphoma, she was receiving treatment for cancer in May 2020.

References

Further reading

External links
Maria Farmer video interview with CBS News, November 2019, cbsnews.com; accessed July 24, 2020.
Maria Farmer, Annie Farmer, and their mother interviewed by ABC News, January 2020, abcnews.go.com; accessed July 24, 2020.

Living people
Santa Clara University alumni
New York Academy of Art alumni
People from Paducah, Kentucky
Jeffrey Epstein
Sexual abuse cover-ups
21st-century American women artists
20th-century American women artists
Anti–human trafficking activists
Date of birth missing (living people)
Year of birth uncertain
Activists from Kentucky
1969 births